James Turner (born 29 August 1998 in Australia) is an Australian rugby union player who plays for the  in Super Rugby.

Turner attended his father’s Alma Mater Newington College. His playing position is wing. He was named in the Waratahs squad for Round 2 of the Super Rugby Trans-Tasman competition. He previously represented  in the 2019 National Rugby Championship.

Turner competed for Australia at the 2022 Rugby World Cup Sevens in Cape Town.

Reference list

External links
itsrugby.co.uk profile

Australian rugby union players
1998 births
Living people
People educated at Newington College
Rugby union wings
Rugby union fullbacks
New South Wales Country Eagles players
New South Wales Waratahs players